The China Railways AM2 class steam locomotive was a class of 4-4-0 steam locomotives operated by the China Railway, built by the Baldwin Locomotive Works in the United States in 1879.

These locomotives were originally built for the Imperial Railroad of North China, which later became known as the Peking−Mukden Railway, and subsequently the Beining Railway; at the time of their introduction, they counted amongst the most modern locomotives of the time. After the Japanese occupation of northern China, the collaborationist Provisional Government of the Republic of China nationalised all railways in its jurisdiction, creating the  North China Transportation Company in 1938 to operate the railways in the region. The NCTC designated these locomotives 'Ameni (アメニ) class.

After the end of the Pacific War, these locomotives were passed on to the Republic of China Railway. After the establishment of the People's Republic of China, China Railways designated them ㄚㄇ2 (AM2) class in 1951, and subsequently AM2 class, in Latin letters instead of Zhuyin script, in 1959.

References

4-4-0 locomotives
Baldwin locomotives
Railway locomotives introduced in 1879
Steam locomotives of China
Standard gauge locomotives of China
Passenger locomotives